Tudora is a village in Ștefan Vodă District, Moldova.

A border crossing into Ukraine is located here. The crossing on the Ukrainian side is called Starokozache.

Gallery

References

Villages of Ștefan Vodă District
Populated places on the Dniester